Piero De Benedictis (stage name Piero) (born 19 April 1945) is an Italian-born Argentine singer/songwriter who also holds Colombian citizenship.

Discography 

Albums
 1969: Piero ("Mi viejo")
 1970: Piero ("Pedro Nadie")
 1972: Coplas de mi país
 1973: Para el pueblo lo que es del pueblo
 1975: Folklore a mi manera
 1975: Sinfonía inconclusa en la mar
 1976: Y mi gente dónde va (inédito en Argentina hasta 1982)
 1981: Recuerdos
 1981: Calor humano (en vivo)
 1982: Canto de la ternura
 1983: Un hombre común (en vivo)
 1984: Qué generosa sos, mi tierra
 1985: El regalao
 1986: Las galaxias nos miran
 1989: A pesar de los pesares
 1989: Piero, 15 años después (en vivo)
 1991: Cachuso Rantifuso (con Marilina Ross y Juan Carlos Baglietto)
 1993: Piero e Indra Devi En la pirámide de Keops (Egipto)
 1999: Piero & Pablo en vivo desde Colombia (con Pablo Milanés)
 2015: Todavía no hicimos lo mejor (grabación en vivo gira por Chile)
 2016: América

Compilations
 1986. Gaviota
 1987: 20 años
 1988: Tríptico - Volumen 1
 1989: Tríptico - Volumen 2
 1993: Te quiero contar
 2001: 30 años de canciones blindadas (compilado con 6 temas inéditos)
 2002 y 2003: reediciones de grandes éxitos (seis discos)
 2004: Colección Oro

Singles
 1964: El cachivache / Rosa, Rosita
 1965: La sombrilla
 1969 Si vos te vas / Mi Viejo

Collectives
 1996 Todas las voces todas

References

External links 
 PIERO “Los argentinos estamos blindados” De Norte A Sur, No.239, July 2001 - in Spanish
 Cinenacional.com - in Spanish
 pieroonline.com Official Website

1945 births
Living people
Argentine folk singers
20th-century Argentine male singers
Italian emigrants to Argentina
20th-century Italian male singers
Naturalized citizens of Argentina
Naturalized citizens of Colombia
Latin Grammy Lifetime Achievement Award winners
Latin music songwriters